Dornase alfa, sold under the brand name Pulmozyme, is used for the treatment of cystic fibrosis. It is a recombinant human deoxyribonuclease I (rhDNase), an enzyme which selectively cleaves DNA. Dornase alfa hydrolyzes the DNA present in sputum/mucus and reduces viscosity in the lungs, promoting improved clearance of secretions. It is produced in Chinese hamster ovary cells.

Medical uses 
Dornase alfa is indicated for the management of people with cystic fibrosis to improve pulmonary function.

Society and culture

Legal status 
Dornase alfa is an orphan drug.

Research 
Dornase alfa has been shown to improve lung function in non-cystic fibrosis pre-term infants atelectasis.

References 

Drugs acting on the respiratory system
Recombinant proteins
Hoffmann-La Roche brands
Genentech brands

de:Desoxyribonuklease#Verwendung als Arzneistoff